
Lubaczów County is a unit of territorial administration and local government (powiat) in Subcarpathian Voivodeship, south-eastern Poland, on the border with Ukraine. It came into being on January 1, 1999, as a result of the Polish local government reforms passed in 1998.

As of 2019 its total population is 55,438, out of which the population of Lubaczów is 12,018, that of Oleszyce is 2,974, that of Narol is 2,071, that of Cieszanów is 1,913, and the rural population is 36,462.

Neighbouring counties
Lubaczów County is bordered by Jarosław County and Przeworsk County to the west, Biłgoraj County to the north, and Tomaszów Lubelski County to the north-east. It also borders Ukraine to the east.

Administrative division
The county is subdivided into eight gminas (one urban, three urban-rural and four rural). These are listed in the following table, in descending order of population.

Rural landscape picture

References

 
Land counties of Podkarpackie Voivodeship